CSTR may refer to:

 The Centre for Speech Technology Research at The University of Edinburgh
 Coinstar (NASDAQ ticker symbol)
 Computer Science Technical Report, particularly those from Bell Labs, often seminal
 Continuous stirred-tank reactor